Ice plant or iceplant may refer to:

Plant common names 
 Aizoaceae, the ice plant family
 Carpobrotus edulis, native to South Africa, and invasive in Australia, California in the US, and the Mediterranean
 Conicosia, narrow-leafed ice plants
 Delosperma cooperi, Cooper's ice plant
 , a Delosperma species
 Disphyma crassifolium, New Zealand iceplant
 Dorotheanthus bellidiformis
 Lampranthus, species
 Mesembryanthemum, ice plant
 Mesembryanthemum crystallinum (syn. Cryophytum crystallinum), common ice plant
 Hylotelephium spectabile, a plant in the stonecrop family, Crassulaceae
 Solanum sisymbriifolium, fire and ice plant

Ice manufacturers 
 Commercial production of ice
 Punta Gorda Ice Plant, a historic ice plant in Punta Gorda, Florida
 Florida Power and Light Company Ice Plant, a historic site in Melbourne, Florida
 Chrystal Water and Power Company-Spencer Water and Ice Company, also known as Spencer Ice Plant, a historic power station and ice manufacturing plant in West Virginia
 Fayetteville Ice and Manufacturing Company: Plant and Engineer's House, a historic ice plant in Fayetteville, North Carolina
 Metz Ice Plant, a historic ice plant in Milford, Pennsylvania